Rainbow Terrace, now known as Lullwater Estate, is the Mediterranean-style Atlanta mansion built for Lucy Beall Candler Owens Heinz (1882–1962), daughter of Coca-Cola co-founder Asa Griggs Candler. The architect was G. Lloyd Preacher, the architect of Atlanta City Hall. It is located at what is now 1610 Ponce de Leon Avenue in the Druid Hills Historic District.

Henry Heinz was shot by a burglar at Rainbow Terrace in 1943. A domestic servant was convicted of the crime, but rumours persisted that a relative murdered him.

The mansion itself is now divided into condominiums, and is now surrounded by townhouses, all together forming a complex.

There are reports that the house is haunted.

References

 Lullwater Estate Owners' Association
 "G. Lloyd Preacher", New Georgia Encyclopedia

G. Lloyd Preacher buildings
Houses completed in 1922
Mediterranean Revival architecture
Reportedly haunted locations in Georgia (U.S. state)
Houses in Atlanta
Druid Hills, Georgia